Sharefarming is a system of farming in which sharefarmers make use of agricultural assets they do not own in return for some percentage of the profits. Sometimes the sharefarmer will receive a wage from the owner instead, although such a person is normally considered a tenant farmer or farm labourer. Two common implementations of the sharefarming concept are sharecropping and sharemilking, although it is applied to other sorts of agricultural assets.

Sharefarming was common in colonial Africa, in Scotland, and in Ireland; it came into wide use in the United States during the Reconstruction era (late 19th-century). In Europe, especially France and Italy, a sharefarming system called metayage once commonly occurred.

While sharefarming can be seen as a form of oppression similar to feudal serfdom and is in practice in many poor areas today, such as India, it is also common in highly developed countries. The latter case occurs where individual farmers prefer not to have complete responsibility for agricultural assets such as the land or livestock, and in such applications it is not considered exploitative.

Sharecropping

Sharecropping is the most common application of the sharefarming principle. In practice, sharefarmers work land which they don't own in return for varying portions of the total profit. In many cases where it is practiced in very poor farming communities it is considered an exploitative model. Sharecropping began after the Civil War and ended between the 1930s and the 1940s because when machines came that could to farming more easily, landowners didn't need actual people working the fields.

Sharemilking

Sharemilking is the application of the sharefarming concept to the dairy industry. Sharemilkers tend to own their own cows but use facilities they do not own to actually milk the cows. This is often a convenient arrangement as milking facilities would otherwise lie empty and unused for several hours of the day.

See also
Metayage System

Agriculture